Onsala BK is a Swedish football club located in Onsala.
Onsala BK is the biggest football club in Halland with over a thousand active players both boys and girls.

Background
Onsala BK currently plays in Swedish football Division 2. They play their home matches at the Rydets IP in Onsala. In the early years, the club also played bandy.

The club is affiliated to Hallands Fotbollförbund. Onsala BK played in the 2011 Svenska Cupen and won 1–0 against Dalstorps IF in the preliminary round before losing 0–3 at home to Lindome GIF in the first round. Onsala BK competed again in 2016-17 Svenska Cupen where they won over Västra Frölunda IF in the first round 4–2 but then lost 6–0 to the Superettan team Ängelholms FF

Roster 2016

Season to season

* League restructuring in 2006 resulted in a new division being created at Tier 3 and subsequent divisions dropping a level.

2016 
This is one of the best years in Onsala BK's history they went winning Swedish football Division 4 Halland with a margin of 15 points, just losing one game all season. Onsala got promoted and will be playing 2017 in Swedish football Division 3 Sydvästra Götaland.

Footnotes

External links
 Onsala BK – Official website

Football clubs in Halland County
Association football clubs established in 1941
Bandy clubs established in 1941